João Guilherme Gonçalves de Sousa (born 13 May 1994) is a Portuguese footballer who plays for C.F. Os Belenenses as a central defender.

Club career
Born in Belas, Sintra, Lisbon District, Sousa moved straight into the Primeira Liga from amateur football in the 2015 January transfer window, when he signed with Moreirense F.C. from Real SC. He made his debut in the former competition on 23 May of that year, coming on as a 78th-minute substitute in a 2–1 away win against F.C. Arouca that was his only appearance of the season.

References

External links

Portuguese League profile 

1994 births
Living people
People from Sintra
Sportspeople from Lisbon District
Portuguese footballers
Association football defenders
Primeira Liga players
Liga Portugal 2 players
Campeonato de Portugal (league) players
Real S.C. players
Moreirense F.C. players
F.C. Vizela players
U.D. Oliveirense players
AD Fafe players
Louletano D.C. players
Amora F.C. players
F.C. Alverca players
C.F. Os Belenenses players